Vincent Mashami is a Rwandan football coach who was appointed manager of the Rwandan national team in August 2018. He has previously coached the national team at youth level, and also club side APR.

References

Date of birth missing (living people)
Living people
Rwandan football managers
Rwanda national football team managers
Year of birth missing (living people)